Michael Keeble Buckland (born 1941) is an emeritus professor at the UC Berkeley School of Information and co-director of the Electronic Cultural Atlas Initiative.

Buckland was born and grew up in England.  He entered library work as a trainee at the Bodleian Library of the University of Oxford after studying history at that university. After taking his professional qualification in librarianship from the University of Sheffield in 1965, he joined the staff at the Lancaster University Library in 1965, one year after it was founded. From 1967 to 1972 he was responsible on a day-to-day basis for the University of Lancaster Library Research Unit where a series of studies were undertaken concerning book usage, book availability, and library management games. In the meanwhile he received his PhD from Sheffield University. His doctoral dissertation, titled Library Stock Control, was later mpublished as a book titled Book Availability and the Library User (Pergamon, 1975). 

In 1972 he moved to the United States to Purdue University Libraries, where he was assistant director of libraries for Technical Services, before becoming dean of the School of Library and Information Studies at Berkeley, 1976–84. From 1983 to 1987 he served as assistant vice president for library plans and policies for the nine campuses of the University of California. He has been a visiting professor in Austria and in Australia.

His writings include Library Services in Theory and Context (Pergamon, 1983; 2nd ed. 1988), Information and Information Systems (Praeger, 1991), Redesigning Library Services (American Library Association, 1992), Emanuel Goldberg and his Knowledge machine (Libraries Unlimited, 2006), and Information and Society (MIT Press, 2017), recipient of the 2018 ASIS&T Best Information Science Book of the Year Award, and Ideology and Libraries: California, Diplomacy, and Occupied Japan, 1945-1952 (Rowman & Littlefield, 2021). His best-known publication is an article: "Information as thing," Journal of the American Society for Information Science 42:5 (June 1991): 351-360. 

Buckland's interests include library services, information retrieval, cultural heritages, and the historical development of information management, including studies of pioneers of documentation, including Suzanne Briet, Emanuel Goldberg, Paul Otlet, Robert Pagès, and Lodewyk Bendikson. He is co-director of the Electronic Cultural Atlas Initiative and was the principal investigator, with Fredric Gey and Ray Larson, of several funded projects including Search Support for Unfamiliar Metadata Vocabularies, to make the searching of subject indexes easier and more reliable; Translingual Information Management Using Domain Ontologies, for improved translingual search support, and Seamless Searching of Numeric and Textual Resources, to facilitate searching across different kinds of databases. He was president of the Association for Information Science and Technology in 1998 and received its Award of Merit in 2012. He was inducted into the California Library Hall of Fame in 2021.

References

External links
Michael Buckland's home page

1941 births
Living people
American librarians
British librarians
British emigrants to the United States
Alumni of the University of Oxford
University of California, Berkeley School of Information faculty
Alumni of the University of Sheffield
Information scientists